Philadelphia National Cemetery is a United States National Cemetery located in the West Oak Lane neighborhood of Philadelphia, Pennsylvania. It was established in 1862 as nine leased lots in seven private cemeteries in the Philadelphia region. In 1881, the current location was established and the graves of soldiers were reinterred from the various leased lots. It is administered by the United States Department of Veterans Affairs, and managed from offices at Washington Crossing National Cemetery. It is 13 acres in size and contains 13,202 burials.

The cemetery contains monuments recognizing the reinterment of soldiers from the Battle of Germantown and the Mexican–American War. A Confederate Soldiers and Sailors Monument was dedicated in 1912 to honor the reinterment of 184 Confederate prisoners of war who died in Philadelphia area hospitals and camps during the American Civil War.

The cemetery was added to the National Register of Historic Places in 1997.

History
It was established in 1862 as one of the original 14 National Cemeteries for the burial of American Civil War soldiers. The cemetery initially consisted of nine leased lots in seven privately owned cemeteries. In 1881, Quartermaster General Montgomery C. Meigs recommended the consolidation of all veteran interments in Philadelphia into one cemetery. The U.S. Federal Government purchased  from Henry J. and Susan B. Freeman in 1885. A federal superintendent was appointed in 1869 for the "number of burials in seven incorporated cemeteries near the city of Philadelphia." Remains were reinterred from seven cemeteries in the Philadelphia area: Lafayette, Lebanon, United American Mechanics Association, Odd Fellows, The Woodlands, Glenwood, Mount Moriah, Bristol, Chester and Whitehall.

The cemetery contains the burial of 350 United States Colored Troops who fought in the Civil War and trained at Camp William Penn in Cheltenham Township, Pennsylvania. It also contains the burial of 66 Buffalo Soldiers from the 9th and 10th Cavalry Regiments and the 24th and 25th Infantry Regiments.

In 1912, the Philadelphia chapter of the United Daughters of the Confederacy sponsored the installation of a nine-foot tall granite stone memorial to recognize the 184 Confederate soldiers and sailors buried at the cemetery. It was dedicated on October 12, 1912 on the 42nd anniversary of the death of Robert E. Lee. The dedication was attended by approximately 1,000 people.

The Mexican-American War monument was erected by the Scott Legion to recognize the 169 men from that conflict buried in Glenwood Cemetery. The soldiers were originally interred at Glenwood Cemetery and were reinterred to Philadelphia National Cemetery in 1927. The Mexican-American War monument was also relocated to the Philadelphia National Cemetery.

There are two structures on the property - a utility shed built in 1936 and a rostrum built in 1939.

In 1997, the cemetery was added to the National Register of Historic Places.

As of September 30, 2008, Philadelphia National Cemetery had 13,202 interments. This number is not expected to change significantly as the cemetery has been closed for new interments since September 1962, except for those in reserved plots and in plots opened by disinterments.

Notable interments
Alphonse Girandy (1868-1941), United States Navy sailor, Medal of Honor recipient
Galusha Pennypacker (1844-1916), Major General during the American Civil War, Medal of Honor recipient
Louis Santop (1890-1942), Baseball Hall of Fame catcher

Images

References

External links

 
 

1862 establishments in Pennsylvania
American Civil War cemeteries
Cemeteries established in the 1860s
Cemeteries in Philadelphia
Cemeteries on the National Register of Historic Places in Philadelphia
Confederate States of America monuments and memorials in Pennsylvania
Historic American Landscapes Survey in Pennsylvania
Monuments and memorials in Philadelphia
United States national cemeteries
West Oak Lane, Philadelphia